Hayes is an industrial town in west London, historically situated within the county of Middlesex, and now part of the London Borough of Hillingdon. The town's population, including its localities Hayes End, Harlington and Yeading, was recorded as 83,564 in the 2011 census. The Grand Union Canal flows through the heart of Hayes, accompanied by the Great Western Main Line and significant industry, a town centre, residential areas and country parks.

Hayes has a long history. The area appears in the Domesday Book (1086). Landmarks in the area include the Grade II* listed Parish Church, St Mary's – the central portion of the church survives from the twelfth century and it remains in use (the church dates back to 830 A.D.) – and Barra Hall, a Grade II listed manor house. The town's oldest public house – the Adam and Eve, on the Uxbridge Road – though not the original seventeenth-century structure, has remained on the same site since 1665.

Hayes is best known as the erstwhile home of EMI. The words "Hayes, Middlesex" appear on the reverse of The Beatles' albums, which were manufactured at the town's Old Vinyl Factory. The town centre's "gold disc" installation marks the fiftieth anniversary on 1 June 2017 of the Beatles' Sgt. Pepper's Lonely Hearts Club Band album, manufactured in Hayes in 1967. The town is the location of the U.K. headquarters of companies including: Heinz, United Biscuits, Fujitsu, and Rackspace U.K.

Notable historical residents include the early modern "father of English music", William Byrd, and a pre-eminent figure of twentieth-century English literature, George Orwell.

Etymology
The place-name Hayes comes from the Anglo-Saxon Hǣs or Hǣse: "(land overgrown with) brushwood". In the Domesday book (1086), it is spelt Hesa. The town's name is spelt Hessee in a 1628 entry in an Inquisition post mortem held at The National Archives.

History
Hayes is formed of what originally were five separate villages: Botwell, Hayes Town, Hayes End, Wood End and Yeading. The name Hayes Town has come to be applied to the area around Station Road between Coldharbour Lane and Hayes & Harlington railway station, but this was historically the hamlet called Botwell. The original Hayes Town was the area to the east of St Mary's Church, centred around Church Road, Hemmen Lane and Freeman's Lane.

For some 700 years up to 1546, Hayes formed part of the Archbishop of Canterbury's estates, ostensibly owing to grants from the Mercian royal family. In that year, the then-Archbishop Thomas Cranmer was forced to surrender his land to King Henry VIII, who subsequently granted the estate to Edward North, 1st Baron North. The area changed hands several times thereafter, but by the eighteenth century, two family-names had established themselves as prominent and long-time landowners: Minet and Shackle.

John Wesley (1703–1791) and Charles Wesley (1707–1788), founders of the evangelical Methodist movement, preached in Hayes on at least ten occasions between 1748 and 1753. The Salvation Army – founded in 1865 in London by William Booth – registered a barracks in Hayes between 1887 and 1896; their hall in Coldharbour Lane was registered in 1927.

In the 18th and 19th centuries, Hayes was home to several private boarding schools catering for wealthy families. The former Manor House on Church Road was by the 1820s a boys' school called Radnor House Academy (a.k.a. Manor House Academy); Grove Cottage, Wood End, a school for young men, opened in the 1830s;  Belle House School for Boys opened on Botwell Lane in the 1840s (it is now St Mary's Convent); in the first half of the 19th century, the Wood End House School for Young Ladies stood on the site of what is now the Norman Leddy Memorial Gardens; the former Magdalen Hall on Hayes End Road was also a 19th-century private School for Young Ladies.

Wood End House (before 1848, the site of the Wood End House School for Young Ladies) was used - from 1848 to c. 1905 - as an asylum. Notable psychiatrist John Conolly (1794-1866) was one of its licensed proprietors, between 1848 and 1866. The building was demolished in 1961.

Until the end of the nineteenth century, Hayes's key areas of work were agriculture and brickmaking. The Second Industrial Revolution brought change in the late nineteenth century, up to World War I. The town's location on the Grand Junction Canal (later called the Grand Union) and the Great Western Railway – Hayes & Harlington railway station had opened in 1868 – made it well-placed for industry.

The town's favourable location caused the Hayes Development Company to make available sites on the north-side of the railway, adjacent to the canal, and Hayes became a centre for engineering and industry. HDC's company secretary, Alfred Clayton, is commemorated in the name of Clayton Road. Residential districts consisting of dwellings of the garden suburb type were built to house workers after World War I.

In 1904 the parish council created Hayes Urban District (from 1930, Hayes and Harlington Urban District) in order to address the issue of population growth. Hayes and Harlington Urban District continued until 1965 when Hayes became part of the newly established London Borough of Hillingdon.

Author George Orwell, who adopted his pen name while living in Hayes, lived and worked in 1932-3 as a schoolmaster at The Hawthorns High School for Boys, situated on Church Road. The school has since closed and the building is now the Fountain House Hotel. The hotel bears a plaque commemorating its distinguished former resident. Returning several times to Hayes, Orwell was at the same time characteristically acerbic about his time in the town, camouflaging it lightly as West Bletchley in Coming Up for Air, as Southbridge in A Clergyman's Daughter, and grumbling comically in a letter to Eleanor Jacques:

Hayes . . . is one of the most godforsaken places I have ever struck. The population seems to be entirely made up of clerks who frequent tin-roofed chapels on Sundays and for the rest bolt themselves within doors.

King Edward VIII visited Hayes (while still Prince of Wales) in January 1936 in order to view the production of His Master's Voice radio instruments.

The Grade II listed War Memorial at Cherry Lane Cemetery on Shepiston Lane commemorates what is believed to have been the most serious single incident (in respect of casualties) in Hayes during World War II. Thirty-seven workers of the HMV Gramophone Company, Blyth Road – then the town's largest employer – were killed on 7 July 1944 when a German V-1 flying bomb or "doodle-bug" hit a factory surface air-raid shelter. The original bomb census form, now held in the National Archives, confirms that it was a flying bomb which landed at 14.59 hours, killing twenty-four people and seriously injuring twenty-one (some of the seriously injured died later). The bomb came down at the main entrance to one shelter, causing the concrete roof to collapse. Some of the badly injured were able to be rescued from the emergency exit at the rear, but others were trapped for some hours. Twelve of the victims are buried in a mass grave in Cherry Lane Cemetery.

The present-day Hayes Police Station – at 755 Uxbridge Road, UB4 8HU – opened on 19 June 1938.

Post-war, Hayes received high traffic congestion due to the lack of a north-south route around the Heathrow area. This was solved in 1992 when the Hayes Bypass trunk road was built. Hayes town centre was also pedestrianised as a result.

Her Majesty Queen Elizabeth II visited Hayes town centre on 19 May 2006 as part of a programme of visits in celebration of her 80th birthday.

Prince William, Kate Middleton and Prince Harry visited Hayes on 20 April 2017, officially opening Global Academy, whose interest in mental well-being is in accord with the Royals' Heads Together mental health charity.

Industry
Hayes has, over the years, been heavily involved with industry, both local and international, having been the home of EMI, Nestlé and H. J. Heinz Company. Past companies include Fairey Aviation (later merged with Westland), and HMV.

The first large factory established was that of the British Electric Transformer Company (affectionately known as the B.E.T.), which moved to Hayes in 1901. The B.E.T.'s main product was the Berry transformer, invented by A. F. Berry (the company's technical adviser and a member of the board of directors); Berry also invented the Tricity cooker.

The most significant early occupier was the Gramophone Company, later His Master's Voice and latterly EMI. The Hayes factory's foundation stone was laid by Dame Nellie Melba. The EMI archives and some early reinforced concrete factory buildings (notably Grade II listed Enterprise House [1912] on Blyth Road, the first known work of Evan Owen Williams - described by English Heritage as "the most significant engineer turned architect in twentieth-century British architecture") remain as The Old Vinyl Factory.

It was here, in the Central Research Laboratories (generally known as  "CRL"), that Isaac Shoenberg developed (1934) the all-electronic 405-line television system (called the Marconi-EMI system, used by the BBC from 1936 until closedown of the Crystal Palace 405-line transmissions in 1985).

Alan Blumlein carried out his research into binaural sound and stereophonic gramophone recording here. "Trains at Hayes Station" (1935) and "Walking & Talking" are two notable films Blumlein shot to demonstrate stereo sound on film. These films are held at the Hayes EMI archive.

In 1939, working alongside the electrical firms A.C. Cossor and Pye, a 60 MHz radar was developed, and from 1941 to 1943 the H2S radar system.

During the 1990s, CRL spawned another technology: Sensaura 3D positional audio. In an echo of Blumlein's early stereo recordings, the Sensaura engineers made some of their first 3D audio recordings at Hayes & Harlington railway station.

During the First World War the EMI factories produced aircraft. Charles Richard Fairey was seconded there for a short time, before setting up his own company, Fairey Aviation, which relocated in 1918 to a large new factory across the railway in North Hyde Road. Over 4,500 aircraft were subsequently produced here, but Fairey needed an airfield to test these aircraft and in 1928 secured a site in nearby Heathrow. This became the Great West Aerodrome, which was requisitioned by the Air Ministry in 1944. It was initially developed as a heavy-bomber base intended for Boeing B-29 Superfortresses, but when the Second World War ended in 1945, it was taken over by the Ministry of Aviation and became Heathrow Airport.

In 1913, German bodybuilder and music hall performer Eugen Sandow – famous in his time as "Sandow the Great", a contender for the title of world's strongest man – opened a cocoa factory in Hayes. Sandow's fortunes plummeted in World War I. The Sandow Cocoa Company went into liquidation, and the building and assets passed to the Hayes Cocoa Company in 1916. Hayes Cocoa was owned by Swiss chocolate company Peter, Cailler, Kohler.

In 1929 the Nestlé company bought out Peter, Cailler, Kohler and located its major chocolate and instant coffee works on the canal, adjacent to the railway east of the station; it was for many years the company's UK headquarters. The factory's elegant Art Deco façade was long a local landmark. The road that led to the factory was renamed Nestlé's Avenue (from Sandow Avenue, so-named after the German strongman); Sandow Crescent, a cul-de-sac off Nestlé's Avenue, remains. The Hayes Nestlé factory closed in 2014 at a cost of 230 jobs. Developers Segro bought the 30-acre Nestlé site in early 2015.

Opposite Nestlé, on the other side of the canal, the Aeolian Company and its associates manufactured player pianos and rolls from just before World War I until the Great Depression. That, and the increasing sophistication of the gramophone record market, led to its demise. Its facilities were subsequently used by, among others, Kraft Foods and Wall's, a meat processor and ice cream manufacturer. Only one of the Aeolian Company's striking Edwardian buildings remains. Designed by notable English architect Walter Cave, Benlow Works (post-World War II owner Benny Lowenthal renamed the factory after himself) on Silverdale Road is a four-storey structure with Diocletian windows on the top floor. It is Grade II listed.

U.K. caravan manufacturer Car Cruiser built caravans in North Hyde Road for a short time in the early 1930s. The company was started by Major C. Fleming-Williams after being demobilised from the R.A.F. in 1919. There is a Car Cruiser Owners' Club, and several examples built in Hayes survive among the membership.

From the early 1970s to 2003 McAlpine Helicopters Limited and Operational Support Services Limited (later renamed McAlpine Aviation Services Limited) operated from two purpose-built helicopter hangars in Swallowfield Way industrial estate, as the company operated on land already owned by Sir Robert McAlpine. The land on the other side of the Grand Union Canal is called Stockley Park and its buildings were intentionally positioned to allow safe passage for helicopters into the heliport in case of an emergency. Fortunately, this was never used.

The first factory to produce the iconic Marshall amplifier opened in June 1964 in Silverdale Road, Hayes. Guitar-amplification pioneer Jim Marshall employed fifteen people to build amplifiers and cabinets in a 5,000-square-foot space.

Damont Audio was a vinyl pressing plant based in Hayes from the 1970s to 2005. "DAMONT" or "Damont Audio Ltd" is typically inscribed in the run-out groove of vinyl produced at the plant.

West London Film Studios sustains Hayes's history in the arts industry by accommodating the production of feature films and TV programmes.

In 1971, Neville Sandelson, MP for Hayes and Harlington 1971–1983, articulated concern about de-industrialisation in the House of Commons: "The position in Hayes . . . is causing grave anxiety both in regard to the present and the long-term prospects. The closure of long-standing industrial firms in the area has become a contagion which shows no sign of abating". By 1982, Sandelson said the contagion had become an epidemic, reiterating: "a subject of great concern to every family in Hayes and Harlington . . . the progressive decline of industry."

Churches

St Mary the Virgin Church, Hayes on Church Road is the oldest building in Hayes. It is Grade II* listed. The central portion of the church, the chancel and the nave, was built in the 13th century, the north aisle in the 15th century (as was the tower), and the south aisle in the 16th century, along with the lychgate and the south porch. The lychgate and wall to the south are Grade II listed. Hayes's entry in the Domesday Book (1086) makes no mention of a church or chapel, and the name of St Mary suggests a 12th-century dedication as it was at this time that church dedications in this name first appeared in England. Besides the church, the other main building in medieval villages was the manor house. The manor house formerly associated with the church was assigned to Canterbury Cathedral by Christian priest Warherdus as far back as 830 AD.

The site of the original manor house is not known, but it is likely to have been on or near the site of the building latterly on Church Road called the Manor House, parts of which dated from the early 16th century. At the time of the Norman Conquest, Archbishop Lanfranc had contacts with the parish. St Mary's has a 12th-century font, and many interesting memorials and brasses. The brass to Robert Lellee, Rector somewhere between 1356 and 1375, is purportedly the oldest brass in Middlesex. Adjacent to it is another to Rector Robert Burgeys (1408–1421). (The first recorded Rector was Peter de Lymonicen [1259]). There are tombs in the church to Walter Grene (1456), Thomas Higate (1576), and Sir Edward Fenner (1611), Judge of the King's Bench. The latter tomb covers earlier tiling on the wall and floors. Some partly uncovered pre-Reformation wall-paintings and a large mural (dating from the 14th century) of Saint Christopher with the infant Child are on the North wall. A brass to Veare Jenyns (1644) relates to the Court of Charles I, while other Jenynses, who were Lords of the Manor, link with Sarah, Duchess of Marlborough. Judge John Heath, after whom Judge Heath Lane was named, is also buried at St Mary's.

Victorian restorers donated a number of windows, and more recent additions include windows to Saints Anselm and Nicholas. The Coronation window is in the north aisle above the Triptych painted by the pre-Raphaelite Edward Arthur Fellowes Prynne. His brother George Fellowes Prynne carved the Reredos with St Anselm and St George in the niches. The embossed roof of the Nave reflects the Tudor period with emblems of the crucifixion and the arms of Henry and Aragon (the lands passed to Henry VIII as a consequence of the English Reformation). Cherry Lane Cemetery on Shepiston Lane was founded in the mid-1930s to provide a new burial ground when the churchyard at St Mary's Church had run out of space.

St Anselm's Church was completed in 1929 to the design of architect Hubert Christian Corlette. Noted designer MacDonald Gill was responsible for the panelled ceiling. The church's foundation stone was laid on 13 May 1927 by Sir John Eldon Bankes. The east window is by James Powell and Sons of Whitefriars, London. The church was Grade II listed in November 2019. St Anselm's is so-named because William Rufus (1056 – 1100) sent Archbishop (later Saint) Anselm of Canterbury (c.1033 – 1109) to stay in the manor house of St Mary's Church, as it was the nearest of the Archbishop's manors to Windsor, where William Rufus resided.

The Immaculate Heart of Mary, the Roman Catholic church in Botwell, was built in 1961, replacing the earlier church built in 1912. The adjacent school, Botwell House Catholic Primary, was opened in 1931. The church's picture of the Immaculate Heart of Mary (which measures 5½m x 3m) was painted by Pietro Annigoni (1910–1988) in Florence, and took nine months to complete. The Grade II listed, early nineteenth-century presbytery, "Botwell House", was originally the home of Hayes's principal landowner, John Baptist Shackle.

Education
Primary and junior schools in Hayes include: Botwell House, Dr Triplett's, Minet, Pinkwell, William Byrd, Hayes Park, Hewens, Grange Park, Cranford Park Academy, Rosedale and Wood End Park Academy. The last two belong to The Park Federation.

Secondary schools in Hayes include: Barnhill Community High School, Guru Nanak Sikh Academy, Harlington School, Hewens College, Rosedale College,Parkside Studio College and Global Academy

Uxbridge College has a Hayes Campus, situated on the former Townfield School site, accessible from Coldharbour Lane.

Camilla, Duchess of Cornwall visited Brookside Primary School on Perth Avenue, Hayes on 23 March 2011.

Prince William, Kate Middleton and Prince Harry officially opened Global Academy on the Old Vinyl Factory site on 20 April 2017.

Economy

Nearby London Heathrow Airport is the largest single provider of employment. The airport's presence generates numerous associated businesses – retail, international distribution and cargo-handling among them. Hotels – such as the Sheraton Hotel on Bath Road, Hayes – benefit, too, from the town's proximity to the airport.

Lombardy Shopping Park is a major retail park in Hayes, near the Uxbridge Road/The Parkway crossing. A smaller development to the east, Hayes Bridge Retail Park, contains retailers such as Currys PC World, Dreams and Metro Bank.

West London Film Studios – situated on Springfield Road, Hayes – is a film and television studio equipped to accommodate everything from small TV productions to big-budget feature films. The Imitation Game (2014), Bridget Jones's Baby (2016) and Killing Eve (2018, 2019 & 2020) are just a few well known productions filmed at the Hayes studios.

Universal Tyres & Spares Ltd – an independent, family-owned tyre-fitting and MOT centre established in 1957 – is situated in the Crown Trading Centre on Clayton Road.

The Nest, on Material Walk in the town's Old Vinyl Factory complex, is a climbing centre. The Nest has a bouldering wall, gym and fitness studio. It opened in September 2019.

Food company Heinz's UK headquarters is located at South Building, Hayes Park, Hayes. The Grade II* listed Heinz buildings are the only British example of the work of influential American architect Gordon Bunshaft (then principal design partner of distinguished architectural firm Skidmore, Owings and Merrill) and one of only two designs by him in Western Europe. The town houses many other head or principal offices of large companies, such as:
The headquarters of United Biscuits – makers of McVitie's biscuits and Jacob's Cream Crackers – is located at Hayes Park Central Building, Hayes End Road, Hayes.
The UK headquarters of I.T. equipment and services company Fujitsu is located at Hayes Park Central, Hayes End Road, Hayes.
Cloud computing company Rackspace operates its U.K. offices from Hyde Park Hayes 3.
The United Kingdom office of China Airlines operates from Hyde Park Hayes 3.
Dental technicians Image Diagnostic Technology Ltd operate their UK offices from Hyde Park Hayes 3.
Leemark Engineering, a machining service specialising in high precision CNC milling and turning, is situated on Rigby Lane, Hayes.
TMD Technologies (Thorn Microwave Devices) is located in Swallowfield Way, Hayes. The firm dates back to the 1940s and EMI's high-power klystron group. It manufactures transmitters and radar equipment, and employs about 220 people. Prince Andrew visited TMD on 14 February 2013 in recognition of its innovation and trade record.
Pipeline/mechanical engineering product-supplier Plumbase Industrial (part of Grafton plc) operates its HQ/inaugural branch from Stewart Quay, Printing House Lane, Hayes.

Culture
Hayes's Beck Theatre opened in 1977, and offers a wide range of touring shows in a welcoming modern building. "The Beck" is very much a community theatre, offering one-night concerts, comedy, drama, films, opera, and pantomime.

The Open Air Theatre, Barra Hall Park originated in 1951 as a community venue for music, theatre and dance. The local community raised funds for a 2005 rebuild.

Hayes's Green Library is situated in the Botwell Green Leisure Centre (address: East Avenue, UB3 2HW), which in 2010 replaced both the old Hayes Library (opened 1933 on Golden Crescent) and the old swimming baths (opened 1967 on the opposite side of Central Avenue). The old swimming baths building remained derelict following its 2010 closure, until Hillingdon Council demolished it in late 2012 having first given itself planning permission for a housing scheme on the site. In 2017, a branch of Lidl opened on the former baths site.

The Adam and Eve is the town's earliest recorded inn: though not the original seventeenth-century structure, it has remained on the same site since 1665.) Other public houses in Hayes include: The Botwell Inn, The Old Crown (Station Road), Ye Olde Crowne (Uxbridge Road), The Grapes, The Carpenter's Arms, and The Wishing Well. The Hayes branch of The Royal British Legion is on the Uxbridge Road. The Hayes Working Men's Club (CIU) – founded 1918; originally in a large house called Sandgate on Station Road, where Argos and Iceland now stand – is on Pump Lane.

A photograph survives from World War I of internationally famous opera star Luisa Tetrazzini entertaining munition workers at HMV Hayes factory during their lunchtime.

Hayes's Gramophone Company contributed a detailed miniature gramophone of mahogany and brass to Queen Mary's Dolls' House; it remains part of the Royal Collection.

Much-loved entertainer Dame Gracie Fields visited Hayes's His Master's Voice factory in 1933; Pathé News footage shows Gracie pressing her four millionth record alongside factory employees and singing the title song of her 1932 film Looking on the Bright Side to huge cheers. Fields's contemporary George Formby visited Hayes's His Master's Voice studios in February 1924. Earlier, several noted music hall performers came to record at Hayes's HMV studios: Formby's father, George Formby Sr, recorded Grandfather's Clock on 12 April 1916; G. H. Elliott recorded Mississippi Honeymoon on 17 November 1922; and Harry Lauder recorded titles including Roamin' In The Gloamin' and I Love a Lassie on 3 March 1926, as well as visiting Hayes on other occasions in the 1910s and '20s.

Botwell House hosted early performances by The Rolling Stones (5 August 1963) and The Who (19 April 1965). Accounts of an open-air pop festival organised at Botwell House in 1963 and 1964  – where performers included Dusty Springfield and Screaming Lord Sutch – suggest these may arguably have been the first examples of an open-air pop festival in the UK (excluding jazz festivals). The Blue Moon club on Church Road – next to Hayes F.C., 1964–1966 – hosted performances by bands including: The Yardbirds (10 June 1964), The Who (20 June 1965), and Eric Clapton's Cream (18 September 1966).

Marc Bolan of glam rock band T. Rex visited Hayes EMI's record pressing plant on 19 June 1972.

Artist Jeremy Deller's installation Sacrilege (an inflatable life-size model of Stonehenge) was installed in Barra Hall Park, Hayes from 10.30 a.m. to 6 p.m. on Sunday 5 August 2012; an estimated 1,400 people attended to view the artwork on the day.

Cinemas

Hayes has had six cinemas in its history. (1.) The town's first cinema, in the silent era, opened in 1913, and was named simply The Hayes Cinema. It was situated at 53–55 Station Road, Hayes – now the site of a branch of Poundland (formerly Woolworths). The Hayes Cinema was renamed Gem Cinema before its closure in the middle of World War I, in 1916. (2.) The Regent Cinema stood between 1924 and 1938 at 16 Station Road, Hayes – now the site of a branch of NatWest bank. The Regent Cinema subsequently became The Regent Theatre (1948–54). Playwright John Osborne performed at the theatre as a young actor, and stars including Kenneth Williams, Diana Dors and John Le Mesurier performed there also early in their careers. Sylvia Rayman's groundbreaking "all-women play" Women of Twilight (1951) was premiered at Hayes's Regent Theatre. (3.) The Corinth Cinema opened in 1933 at 1040 Uxbridge Road. Renamed The Essoldo in 1949, it was the first cinema in the area to be equipped with CinemaScope and stereophonic sound. After purchasing an alternative building nearby in 1957 (infra), the Essoldo chain closed this cinema in 1961. The address is now the site of the town's Point West Building. (4.) The Ambassador Theatre existed between 1938 and 1961 on the area of East Avenue, Hayes which is now occupied by the British Telecommunications Centre (formerly a GPO telephone exchange). Actress Valerie Hobson made a personal appearance on the occasion of the Ambassador Theatre's opening on 19 December 1938; she starred in the film screened for the occasion: This Man Is News. (5.) The Savoy Cinema existed from 1939 to 1957 at 466 Uxbridge Road, Hayes. The building was designed by noted cinema architect George Coles. Some famous artists performed on stage at Hayes's Savoy Cinema over the years – Max Miller, Josephine Baker and Adam Faith among them. The Essoldo chain bought the Savoy in 1957, renaming it The Essoldo in 1962 (after closing its nearby namesake in 1961). This incarnation of the Essoldo closed in 1967. Coles' building was converted into an Essoldo Bingo Club; it became a Ladbrokes Lucky 7 Club, and is now a branch of Mecca Bingo. (6.) The Classic Cinema (1972–1986) was located above a Waitrose supermarket, at 502 Uxbridge Road, Hayes. Subsequently, demolished, its entrance was immediately to the left of the former Savoy (see 5, above).

Media
Hayes FM (91.8 FM) is the town's community-focused, non-commercial local radio station. The station provides a platform for discussion of local matters, and besides playing popular music caters musically to a variety of tastes and genres, including indie and urban music. Since "Hayes, Middlesex" is famously present on the reverse of the Beatles' 1960s LPs (which were manufactured at the town's Old Vinyl Factory), it is appropriate that Hayes FM should boast Europe's longest running Beatles-themed radio show.

The Hillingdon & Uxbridge Times is a local newspaper, and formerly the Hayes and Harlington Gazette.

Sport
Hayes & Yeading United F.C. formed on 18 May 2007, following a merger of the former Hayes F.C. and Yeading F.C. Hayes & Yeading F.C.'s home-ground is (from 2016) on Beaconsfield Road, Hayes. The former Hayes F.C. started out as Botwell Mission in 1909, taking the name Hayes F.C. in 1929. The team's home-ground was on Church Road, Hayes. The Church Road stadium continued in May 2007 as Hayes & Yeading's ground until 19 April 2011, when the team played at Church Road for the last time, beating Gateshead 3–1. The former Church Road ground was demolished in 2011, and is now the site of housing. The team played in the interim at Woking's Kingfield Stadium and Maidenhead's York Road. Persevering with initial setbacks, the team is rightly back in Hayes. The Church Road ground saw the start of the career of a number of players who went on to play at higher levels, among them Les Ferdinand, Cyrille Regis and Jason Roberts MBE.

Hayes has a second Non-League football team, A.F.C. Hayes; they were known until 2007 as Brook House F.C.

Hayes Cricket Club's records date back to 1797. The club joined the Middlesex Cricketers League in the 1970s, becoming three-time League champions in the 1980s. The club subsequently entered the Thames Valley Cricket League. Hayes Cricket Club's ground is situated behind the Beck Theatre and Botanical Gardens.

Rugby football is represented by two Hayes clubs. Hayes RFC compete in the Middlesex Merit Development League, alongside London Welsh Amateurs, and teams from Hanwell, Chiswick and Whitton; Hayes RFC's home-ground is The Pavilions, Grosvenor Playing Fields, Kingshill Avenue, Hayes UB4 8BZ. Hillingdon Abbots RFC compete in the Herts/Middlesex 2 league; Hillingdon Abbots RFC's home-ground is Pole Hill Open Spaces, Gainsborough Road, Hayes UB4 8PS.

Hayes Amateur Boxing Club was formed in 1948. Trainer Dickie Gunn started the club at Hayes's Townfield School. Interim locations included St Christopher's Approved School and Harlington Scout Hut, until in 1978 the club was granted a piece of land at the back of Judge Heath Lane Sports Centre. A concerted effort by club-trainers, boxers and committee-members produced for the club a purpose-built gym. In 2006 the land on which the gym was built was sold for development, and, following a campaign, a replacement facility was built to the front of the former Hayes Stadium. From its formation, the club has produced successful boxers at national competition level. Chris Finnegan represented the pinnacle of the club's success, winning the 1966 Amateur Boxing Association Middleweight title, before going on to win the Olympic Middleweight gold medal in 1968.

Hayes Bowls Club manages one of Hillingdon's twelve bowling greens, at Botwell Green, Central Avenue, Hayes. The green is used for club and public bowling, with green-fees payable to the club.

On 24 July 2012, Hayes was the gateway for the Olympic Torch's passage into Hillingdon borough in the 2012 Summer Olympics torch relay; the route traversed North Hyde Road and Dawley Road.

Geography

Hayes (inc. Harlington and Yeading) is located next to Southall, Yiewsley, West Drayton, Hillingdon, Northolt and Cranford.

Hayes has several parks and public gardens, including: Barra Hall Park, Minet Country Park, the Norman Leddy Memorial Gardens, and Lake Farm Country Park.

The M4 motorway runs directly to the south of town, while the A312 Hayes bypass formes the town's eastern border.

Along with urban and suburban areas, a fair amount of Hayes is almost rural, especially to the south of the motorway around Harlington, and in the north around Hayes End and Yeading Brook Meadows.

Listed buildings
A listed building is one that has been placed on the Statutory List of Buildings of Special Architectural or Historic Interest.

Conservation areas
Historic England-protected conservation areas (of recognised cultural value):
 Botwell (Nestlé's), Hayes – Hillingdon
 Botwell (Thorn/EMI), Hayes – Hillingdon
 Bulls Bridge, Hayes – Hillingdon

Related listings
Grade II listings are given to early 20th century electric transformer pillars bearing the town's name as part of the manufacturer's address: British Electric Transformer Company, Hayes, Middlesex. The listings are made for these reasons: "[1] Design interest: the transformer pillars produced by the British Electric Transformer Company are handsome pieces of industrial design. [2] Historic interest: . . . survives from the early period of mass electricity supply, which was to have a revolutionary effect on British domestic life."

In popular culture

Film

Galton and Simpson-scripted comedy The Bargee (1964) stars Harry H. Corbett and Ronnie Barker as boatmen operating a canal-boat along the Bull's Bridge, Hayes section of the Grand Union Canal.

Director Ken Loach's first feature film Poor Cow (1967) – a noted example of kitchen sink drama starring Carol White and Terence Stamp – was filmed partly in Hayes.

The Beatles' 1967 film Magical Mystery Tour followed the band and their entourage on a surreal musical journey. Hayes is not listed among the featured locations, but the town's name features throughout. The famous Magical Mystery Tour coach – a Plaxton-bodied Panorama 1, based on the six-wheeled Bedford VAL 14 chassis, registered URO 913E and painted yellow and blue with psychedelic logos – was chartered by EMI from Fox Coaches of Hayes, who purchased the vehicle new in March 1967. The firm's name – "Fox of Hayes" – is visible throughout the film, above the coach's licence-plate.

Parts of Chocolat (2000), starring Juliette Binoche and Johnny Depp, were filmed in Barra Hall, Hayes.

The scene in Bend It Like Beckham (2002) where Jess (Parminder Nagra) meets Juliette (Keira Knightley) was filmed in Barra Hall Park, Hayes; the Hounslow Harriers' practice pitch in the film is the nearby old Yeading Football Club pitch.

The Sheraton Hotel on Bath Road, Hayes features in four films: Otto Preminger's final film, The Human Factor (1979) starring Richard Attenborough, Michael Caine spy thriller The Whistle Blower (1986), director Ridley Scott's thriller The Counsellor (2013), and crime drama The Infiltrator (2016) starring Bryan Cranston.

Marvel superhero film Thor: The Dark World (2013) includes scenes filmed on the site of the old EMI complex on Blyth Road, Hayes.

Brad Pitt caused a stir in Hayes in November 2012 when filming scenes for horror film World War Z (2013) at locations off Hayes End Road; the actor reportedly dined at Tommy Flynn’s Bar and Diner, on Wood End Green Road.

Keira Knightley returned to Hayes to co-star with Benedict Cumberbatch in British-American thriller The Imitation Game (2014), filmed at the town's West London Film Studios.

Comedians Freddie Starr (1993), Frank Carson (1993), and Mike Reid (1993) & (1998) have issued on video and DVD performances filmed at Hayes's Beck Theatre.

Television

The BBC filmed a 1949 performance of A.G. Macdonell's stage-comedy The Fur Coat in Hayes's Regent Theatre (in existence 1948–54); the cast included Richard Bebb and silent film star Chili Bouchier.

Doctor Who, first story of Series 9 (January 1972), saw third Doctor Jon Pertwee's first encounter with the Daleks in a four-week story titled "Day of the Daleks"; filming locations included the Bull's Bridge, Hayes section of the Grand Union Canal.

Two episodes of 1970s police drama The Sweeney included scenes filmed on Blyth Road, Hayes: "Contact Breaker" (Series 1, Episode 12; broadcast 20 March 1975), and "Faces" (Series 2, Episode 2; broadcast 8 September 1975).

Rowan Atkinson filmed a swimming-pool-based episode of his popular series Mr. Bean (Series 1, Episode 3; broadcast 30 December 1990) at the (since-relocated) old swimming baths on Central Avenue, Hayes.

Channel 5 soap opera Family Affairs (1997–2005) was filmed at HDS Studios, Beaconsfield Road, Hayes, with outdoor scenes filmed at the nearby Willowtree Marina section of the Grand Union Canal.

BBC sitcom One Foot in the Grave featured the exploits of the curmudgeonly Victor Meldrew in an unnamed English suburb; Series 6, Episode 5 – "The Dawn of Man" (broadcast 13 November 2000) – included scenes filmed on Glencoe Road, Hayes.

Andy Hamilton's 2003 BBC sitcom Trevor's World of Sport was filmed partly in Hayes.

BBC crime-drama Waking the Dead two-part episode "Multistorey" (Series 3, Parts 1 & 2; broadcast 14 & 15 September 2003) included scenes filmed around the car park above Iceland supermarket on Station Road, Hayes.

An early episode of detective drama Lewis – "Expiation" (Series 1, Episode 3; broadcast 6 July 2008) – included scenes filmed at HDS Studios, Beaconsfield Road, Hayes.

BBC crime-drama New Tricks episode "Things Can Only Get Better" (Series 10, Episode 7; broadcast 10 September 2013) included scenes filmed around Hayes & Harlington railway station.

ITV television film Churchill's Secret (broadcast: 28 February 2016), starring Michael Gambon, was filmed at Hayes's West London Film Studios.

Apple TV+ television series Ted Lasso starring Jason Sudeikis, is filmed at Hayes's West London Film Studios, as well as Hayes & Yeading United F.C.

Governance and public services

Hayes is in the UK parliament Hayes and Harlington constituency, most recently represented by John McDonnell (Labour).

Hayes is patrolled by the Metropolitan Police and served by the general Hillingdon Hospital.

Transport

Road

The area is close to junctions 3 and 4 of the M4 motorway. The A312 is the main north-south route. The A4020 Uxbridge Road is the main West-East route passing directly through Hayes.

Rail

Hayes & Harlington railway station is the main railway station here on the Great Western Main Line. It provides direct connections eastbound to London Paddington and westbound to Reading. It is also served by trains on the Heathrow spur connecting it to the airport without an intermediate stop. Hayes & Harlington was renovated ahead of the opening of the Elizabeth line expected in 2022. The line will link Hayes directly to London's West End and beyond.

Buses
London Buses serving Hayes are:

Water

The Grand Union Canal runs through Hayes. Travellers by boat may moor at Hayes and take advantage of its local amenities, such as shops (which include branches of Sainsbury's, Tesco, Iceland, Asda, Lidl, Greggs, Boots, WHSmith), and banks.

Notable people

 Frank Allen (1943-), bass player of sixties pop groups Cliff Bennett and the Rebel Rousers and The Searchers, was born in Hayes.
 Writer and so-called "godfather of alternative comedy" Tony Allen (1945-) was born in Hayes.
 Anselm of Canterbury (1033/4–1109), later Saint Anselm, was stationed in Hayes by King William II in 1095.
 Buster Bloodvessel (1958-), frontman of eighties pop group Bad Manners, lives on a canal boat in Hayes.
 Virtuoso French horn player Dennis Brain (1921-1957) – credited with producing arguably the definitive recordings of Mozart's horn concerti – lived from 1945 in a bungalow in Hayes.
 Robin Bush (1943–2010) of Channel 4's archaeological series Time Team was born in Hayes.
 Composer William Byrd (1539/40-1623), "the father of English music", lived as a Catholic recusant in Hayes and Harlington 1578–88; a primary school in the area bears his name.
 Alderman Harvey Combe (1752-1818) - Whig politician; Lord Mayor of London in 1799 - lived in Hayes and is buried in St Mary's churchyard.
 Brian Connolly (1945–1997), singer of glam rock band Sweet, lived in Hayes and Harefield.
 Disgraced disc jockey Chris Denning (1941-) was born in Hayes.
 Actress Anne Marie Duff (1970-) – best known for playing Fiona Gallagher in Shameless and Elizabeth I in The Virgin Queen – grew up in Hayes, attending Mellow Lane School.
 Greg Dyke (1947-), former BBC director general and former chairman of the FA, grew up in Hayes.
 Pioneer in photography B. J. Edwards (1838–1914) lived at Wistowe House (which dates from the 17th century) on Church Road.
 Chris Finnegan (1944–2009), Olympic boxing gold medalist, lived in Hayes.
 Boxer Kevin Finnegan (1948–2008), brother of Olympic gold medalist Chris, lived in Hayes.
 Bandleader Bert Firman (1906-1999) – popular in the 1920s, '30s and '40s – worked daily from 1924 to 1929 in Hayes's Zonophone recording studios.
 Actor Barry Foster (1927–2002), best known as 1970s TV detective Van der Valk, grew up in Hayes.
 Musician Paul Gardiner (1958–1984) of Gary Numan's Tubeway Army was born in Hayes.
 Major-General James Grant, C.B. (1778–1852), who served under Wellington at the Battle of Waterloo, was a lifelong Hayes resident.
 Celebrity tailor Doug Hayward (1934–2008) grew up in Hayes.
 Sir Peter Hendy (1953-), chairman of Network Rail and former Commissioner of Transport for London, was born in Hayes.
 England footballer Glenn Hoddle (1957-) was born in Hayes.
 Noted atomic and nuclear physicist Friedrich Georg Houtermans (1903–1966) lived between 1933 and 1935 in Hayes, where he worked for EMI.
 Golfer Barry Lane (1960-) was born in Hayes.
 Honey Lantree (1943-2018), celebrated female drummer of Joe Meek-produced sixties pop group The Honeycombs, was born in Hayes.
 Sir Francis Lee, 4th Baronet (1639–1667), politician and (from 1644) stepson of Henry Wilmot, 1st Earl of Rochester, was educated in Hayes by Dr Thomas Triplett. His son Edward Lee at age 13 married the 12-year-old Lady Charlotte Fitzroy, an illegitimate daughter of Charles II.
 Screenwriter, Audio Playwright and Graphic Novelist Tony Lee (1970-), whose work including Pride and Prejudice and Zombies, Doctor Who and Star Trek have topped the New York Times Best Seller list, was born in Hayes, attending Hayes Manor Secondary School.
 Lady Harriet Mordaunt (1848–1906) – respondent in a sensational divorce case in which King Edward VII, while still Prince of Wales, was embroiled – lived for several years from 1877 in Hayes Park Private Asylum (now Barra Hall).
 Author George Orwell (1903–1950) lived and worked in Hayes, 1932-3.

 Malcolm Owen (1955-1980) and Paul Fox (1951-2007) of punk band The Ruts grew up in Hayes.
 Larry Page (c. 1938-), sixties manager of pop groups The Kinks and The Troggs, was born in Hayes.
 Colin Phipps (1934-2009) - geologist, Labour MP, and founding member of the SDP - was born and schooled in Hayes.
 Steve Priest (1948-2020), bass player of glam rock band Sweet, was born in Hayes.
 A reredos created by noted church architect George Fellowes Prynne(1853–1927) and his brother, the artist Edward Arthur Fellowes Prynne (1854–1921) is to be found in St Mary the Virgin Church, Hayes.
 Jane Seymour (1951-), actress in the titular role in Dr. Quinn, Medicine Woman and Bond girl, was born in Hayes.
 Tennis player Maud Shackle (1870–1962) – twice a Wimbledon finalist, and the first ambidextrous player - was born in Hayes.
 Nick Simper (1945-), founding member of Rock band Deep Purple, lived in Hayes.
 David Smart (1929-2007), co-owner of Billy Smart's Circus and Windsor Safari Park and a son of Billy Smart Sr., was born in Hayes.
 Composer Stephen Storace (1762–1796), famous in his day and a friend of Mozart, lived from the late 1780s in Wood End, Hayes. Mozart created the role of Susanna in The Marriage of Figaro (1786) for his sister, Nancy Storace (1765–1817).
 Prebendary and philanthropist Dr Thomas Triplett (1602–1670) was a schoolmaster in Hayes during the Commonwealth period (see Sir Francis Lee, above); a primary school in the area bears his name.
 David Westlake (1965-), singer/songwriter of indie band The Servants, was born in Hayes.
 Welsh international footballer Rhoys Wiggins (1987-) grew up in Hayes.
 Football player/manager/pundit Ray Wilkins (1956-2018) grew up in Hayes.
 Former TUC leader Norman Willis (1933–2014) was born in Hayes.
 Sunrise Radio presenter Paul Shah (1977-) currently lives in Hayes.

Gallery

Nearest places

 Cranford
 Ealing
 Greenford
 Hanwell
 Harlington
 Harmondsworth
 Heston
 Hillingdon
 Hounslow
 Northolt
 Southall
 Stockley Park
 Uxbridge
 West Drayton
 Yeading
 Yiewsley

External links

 Her Majesty the Queen visits Hayes, 19 May 2006
 Prince William, Kate Middleton & Prince Harry visit Hayes, 20 April 2017
 1936 view of Hayes's HMV Factory
 1938 view of Sir Kingsley Wood visiting Fairey Aviation, Hayes
 1930s view of the Grand Union Canal (Hayes at 6:35)
 1954 view of Lincoln's, 88 East Avenue British Pathé
 1956 view of Hayes and Harlington Urban District
 1956 view of Hayes and Harlington
 1961 view of Hayes schoolchildren Our Future Citizens
 1962 view of Immaculate Heart of Mary church British Pathé
 1962 District Council film At Your Service
 1964 BBC interview – munitions-factory worker The Great War
 2013 view of Hayes on television in New Tricks
 HMV's 1925 Catalogue of Instruments made in Hayes
 Life down the shelters in Hayes BBC WW2 People's War
 My wartime childhood in Hayes BBC WW2 People's War
 Doodlebugs in Hayes 1944 BBC WW2 People's War
 Large collection of photos of Hayes & Harlington
 HayesMiddlesex.com – about Hayes & Harlington
 Articles recalling Hayes's past
 Hayes People's History
 Memories of Mellow Lane School Girls' Choir, Hayes

British History Online entries concerning Hayes:

References

Areas of London
Places formerly in Middlesex
Districts of the London Borough of Hillingdon
District centres of London